USS Pinnacle is the name of two ships of the U.S. Navy:

 , a minesweeper in naval service 1944–46
 , an ocean minesweeper in service 1955–1977

References 

United States Navy ship names